Kosta Tomašević (Serbian Cyrillic: Коста Томашевић; 25 July 1923 – 13 March 1976) was a Serbian footballer remembered for his illustrious career with Red Star Belgrade. Tomašević also represented both the Yugoslav and Serbian national football teams, including playing at the 1948 Summer Olympics.

References

External links
Profile at Serbian federation official site

1923 births
1976 deaths
Yugoslav footballers
Yugoslavia international footballers
Serbian footballers
People from Stara Pazova
OFK Beograd players
Red Star Belgrade footballers
Yugoslav First League players
Olympic footballers of Yugoslavia
Olympic silver medalists for Yugoslavia
Footballers at the 1948 Summer Olympics
1950 FIFA World Cup players
Association football forwards
Serbian football managers
Olympic medalists in football
Medalists at the 1948 Summer Olympics